Jaihind TV is an Indian Malayalam language free to air news and entertainment channel. owned by Bharat Broadcasting Network Limited. it was launched on 17 August 2007, in Delhi by the Indian National Congress President and United Progressive Alliance Chairperson Sonia Gandhi.

This channel is promoted by the Congress party with the support of non-resident Indians. Ramesh Chennithala, is the Chairman of the Channel.

References

External links 
Official site
 Official Facebook

Television stations in Thiruvananthapuram
Malayalam-language television channels
Television channels and stations established in 2007
2007 establishments in Kerala